Chestnut Hill Township is one of nineteen townships in Ashe County, North Carolina, United States. The township had a population of 828 as of the 2010 census.

Chestnut Hill Township occupies  in northeastern Ashe County. The township's eastern border is with Alleghany County. There are no incorporated municipalities within Chestnut Hill Township.

References

Townships in Ashe County, North Carolina
Townships in North Carolina